Dario Vangeli (born 3 January 1988) is an Italian male boxer twice world champion, in 2011 and 2015, at the World Police and Fire Games.

References

External links
 Dario Vangeli at Fiamme Oro

1988 births
Living people
Italian male boxers
Boxers of Fiamme Oro
Light-welterweight boxers